Diggers Rest railway station is located on the Sunbury line in Victoria, Australia. It serves the north-western Melbourne suburb of Diggers Rest, and it opened on 2 October 1859.

History

Diggers Rest opened on 2 October 1859, eight months after the line from Sunshine was extended to Sunbury. Like the suburb itself, the station was named after the fact that the area was used as a resting place for prospectors travelling to Bendigo during the Victorian gold rush.

At the time of opening, a small goods shed and siding were provided. In 1928, interlocked gates were provided at the Calder Highway level crossing, and were replaced with boom barriers in 1982. In 1989, the goods siding was abolished and, in 1992, the remaining crossover was removed. The waiting room and booking lobby inside the building on Platform 1 were also provided in that year and, along with the signal box, was restored in 2002, after being damaged by fire during the previous year. On 16 April 2005, the signal box was abolished, as part of the Regional Fast Rail project.

On 18 November 2012, the station was added to the metropolitan network, when the line between Watergardens and Sunbury was electrified. As part of those works, the station was refurbished, with both platforms extended at the Up (Flinders Street) end. The car park was also enlarged.

On 21 October 2022, the Level Crossing Removal Project announced that the Old Calder Highway level crossing was to be grade separated with a road over rail design. Also in that year, both platforms were extended in length, from 159m to 163m.

Platforms and services

Diggers Rest has two side platforms. It is served by Sunbury line trains.

Platform 1:
  all stations and limited express services to Flinders Street

Platform 2:
  all stations services to Sunbury

By late 2025, it is planned that trains on the Sunbury line will be through-routed with those on the Pakenham and Cranbourne lines, via the new Metro Tunnel.

Transport links

Sunbury Bus Service operates one route via Diggers Rest station, under contract to Public Transport Victoria:
 : Sunbury station – Moonee Ponds Junction

Gallery

References

External links
 Rail Geelong gallery
 Melway map at street-directory.com.au

Railway stations in Melbourne
Railway stations in Australia opened in 1859
Transport in the City of Melton
Buildings and structures in the City of Melton